Angelina Margaret Hoare (17 May 1843 – 10 January 1892) was a missionary from Kent, England, who devoted her life to the advancement of women's education in British India.

Background
She was the daughter of the banker Henry Hoare (1807–1866) and his wife Lady Mary Marsham, daughter of Charles Marsham, 2nd Earl of Romney, born in Spring Gardens, London. She was a sixth child in a family of 12. Her brother Walter Hoare was a cleric, and served as curate to Robert Milman, who became Bishop of Calcutta. Maria Milman, sister of Robert, invited the Hoare daughters to India, in 1874.

Works
Hoare founded the St. John's Diocesan Girls' Higher Secondary School, Calcutta, West Bengal, India. She started many other educational institutions in India. She used to work by taking suggestions and interacting with various native clergymen and pandits to draw out an educational plan. She avoided anglicising the girls or introducing foreign dress or habits. She wrote in one of the letters to her brother in England : "...my idea of the future of our Diocesan School is that it should be an institution not confined to any particular society or an elite group..."

Death
She died aged 48 in 1892. On her death, Ralph Johnson, the Bishop of Calcutta, praised her, stating:
...be assured, all of you that her devoted life has not been lost, for the public of Calcutta. The work she has done can never be altogether lost sight of. Not to mention the seed she has sown in the hearts of her beloved children in the Diocesan School of Calcutta and other schools in the Sundarbans , which will bear fruit in the generations to come...

References

External links

St. John's Diocesan Girls' Higher Secondary School
CNI Diocese of Calcutta – Bishops
Cross, F. L. (ed.) (1957) The Oxford Dictionary of the Christian Church. Oxford U. P.; pp. 686–88: "India, Christianity in"
Chapter XXVII. The Mother Diocese of Calcutta, 1815 - A History of the Church of England in India, SPCK, 1924
Diocese of Kolkata - Church of North India

1843 births
1892 deaths
19th-century Anglican nuns
English Anglican missionaries
People from Kent
British people in colonial India
Anglican missionaries in India